The 1929 Army Cadets football  represented the United States Military Academy in the 1929 college football season. Led by head coach Biff Jones, the Cadets offense scored 276 points, while the defense allowed 132 points. The club started the season with three wins and one tie but finished with a 6–4–1 record.

The 1929 game between Army and Notre Dame had the highest attendance in the series at 79,408.

Schedule

References

Army
Army Black Knights football seasons
Army Cadets football